Krasimikha is a rural locality (a village) in Azletskoye Rural Settlement, Kharovsky District, Vologda Oblast, Russia. The population was 25 as of 2002.

Geography 
Krasimikha is located 50 km northwest of Kharovsk (the district's administrative centre) by road. Zarodikha is the nearest rural locality.

References 

Rural localities in Kharovsky District